The Kidd House in Lavonia, Georgia, also known as Kidd Residence was built in 1919.  It is a -story bungalow house with Craftsman interior details.  It was designed by architect Leila Ross Wilburn.

In a survey of historic resources in Lavonia, the house with its pecan grove were found to be significant architecturally "as one of the most elaborate examples of Craftsman/Bungalow design" in the area, and also as an example of a small farmstead in the city, and also for its association with C.A. Kidd, Sr.

It was listed on the National Register of Historic Places in 1983.

References

Houses on the National Register of Historic Places in Georgia (U.S. state)
Houses completed in 1919
Houses in Franklin County, Georgia
American Craftsman architecture in Georgia (U.S. state)
Bungalow architecture in Georgia (U.S. state)
National Register of Historic Places in Franklin County, Georgia